Millbury, officially the Town of Millbury, is a town in Worcester County, Massachusetts. Located within Blackstone Valley, the population in Millbury was 13,831 at the 2020 United States Census.

History

Millbury was first settled by Europeans in 1716. It was originally known as the Second or North Parish of Sutton. Because traveling from one part of the town to the other for meetings was time-consuming, inhabitants of the North Parish petitioned the Massachusetts General Court to split Sutton. North Parish became Millbury on June 11, 1813 by way of an act of incorporation. Its name derived from its long history as a mill town. The Blackstone River flows through the town, and during the Industrial Revolution, provided water power to its many textile mills and factories. During this time, the inventor William Crompton worked in Millbury.

Millbury's industrial history begins in the early eighteenth century, not long after the area's settlement. In 1735, John Singletary began operating a mill on Singletary Brook, a stream flowing out of Singletary Lake. Around 1753, Singletary built the S & D Spinning Mill, which is still in operation, making it one of the oldest continuously operated mills in the United States. The mill is featured on the Town Seal. The mill also makes the inner parts of the Rawlings baseballs for use in Major League Baseball.

In the late eighteenth and early nineteenth centuries, after learning the trade of firearms production from their father, Asa Waters and his brother, Elijah, purchased land along the Blackstone River and built mills producing goods such as guns, scythes, and sawmill equipment. In 1808, they erected an armory, which was successful until forced to close suddenly in 1841. It reopened at the start of the American Civil War in 1861. With the wealth received from the industry, Asa began construction of the Asa Waters Mansion in 1826. Designed by local architect Asher Benjamin, it was completed six years later.

Louise Taft, mother of United States President William Howard Taft, resided in Millbury for many years, and President Taft spent many summer vacations in the town during his youth. He visited his aunt, Delia C. Torrey, during his presidency to celebrate Millbury's centennial. The Torrey House, where President Taft stayed, is now commonly called the Taft House.

In 1824, the mineral called Vermiculite was first found in Millbury.

Due to the Flood Control Act of 1944, the Worcester Flood Diversion Channel was constructed in that year within Millbury, as well as nearby Auburn.

In the early 1970s, Millbury experienced a number of large fires. The town hall burned down, followed by the Union School. A propane plant near Route 146 exploded, causing considerable damage and making nationwide news.

In 2004, Millbury was designated as a Preserve America community.

Millbury celebrated its bicentennial in 2013. The local Vaillancourt Folk Art designed chalkware for the celebration. Later that year, a proposal for a casino was made, but the related development company pulled out when it became clear that a large majority of inhabitants were against the proposal.

Geography
The town is within the Blackstone Valley and is drained by the Blackstone River.

Historic places
Millbury has three sites on the National Register of Historic Places:

Demographics

As of the census of 2020, there were 13,831 people, 4,927 households, and 3,443 families residing in the town. The racial makeup of the town was 97.19% White, 0.53% African American, 0.15% Native American, 1.02% Asian, 0.03% Pacific Islander, 0.23% from other races, and 0.84% from two or more races. Hispanic or Latino of any race were 1.02% of the population.

There were 4,927 households, out of which 30.2% had children under the age of 18 living with them, 55.7% were married couples living together, 10.9% had a female householder with no husband present, and 30.1% were non-families. Of all households, 24.6% were made up of individuals, and 10.3% had someone living alone who was 65 years of age or older. The average household size was 2.53 and the average family size was 3.03.

In the town, the population was spread out, with 23.1% under the age of 18, 6.3% from 18 to 24, 31.2% from 25 to 44, 23.4% from 45 to 64, and 16.0% who were 65 years of age or older. The median age was 39 years. For every 100 females, there were 93.3 males. For every 100 females age 18 and over, there were 88.4 males.

The median income for a household in the town was $51,415, and the median income for a family was $62,564. Males had a median income of $41,912 versus $28,973 for females. The per capita income for the town was $23,531. About 4.1% of families and 6.3% of the population were below the poverty line, including 8.2% of those under age 18 and 8.4% of those age 65 or over

Education

In 1826, the first formal lyceum school was founded by Josiah Holbrook in Millbury.

Public schools in Millbury fall under the jurisdiction of Millbury Public Schools school district. Approximately 2,000 students are educated in three schools: Elmwood Street School, (grades Pre-K through 3); Raymond E. Shaw Elementary School (grades 4 through 6); and Millbury Memorial Junior/Senior High School (grades 7 through 12).

Millbury Public Library opened in 1864. In fiscal year 2008, the town spent 1.15% ($358,097) of its budget on the library.

Government

Notable people

 Ron Darling, Major League Baseball player
 Wilton S. Farnsworth, journalist
 Nick Fatool, musician
 Warren G. Harris, member of the Massachusetts Governor's Council
 Abby Kelley, abolitionist
 Francis March, polymath
 Michael O. Moore, member of the Massachusetts Senate
 Albert L. Nash, politician
 George A. Sheridan, congressman
 Amos Singletary, member of the Massachusetts Senate
 Louise Taft, mother of United States President William Howard Taft
 Asa Waters, industrialist
 George E. White, congressman
 Lawrence Whitney, athlete
 Howie Winter, mobster

See also
 List of mill towns in Massachusetts

References

External links

 Official website
 Millbury Public Library website
 Millbury Historical Society website
 Millbury Public Schools website

1813 establishments in Massachusetts
Populated places established in 1716
Towns in Massachusetts
Towns in Worcester County, Massachusetts
Millbury, Massachusetts